Melvin Kingsale (born 2 April 1997) is a Dutch football player of Curaçao descent who last played for FC Dordrecht.

Club career
He made his professional debut in the Eerste Divisie for FC Dordrecht on 3 February 2017 in a game against Fortuna Sittard.

References

External links
 

1997 births
Dutch people of Curaçao descent
Living people
Dutch footballers
FC Dordrecht players
Eerste Divisie players
SC Feyenoord players
Association football defenders